My Kind of Music is the debut studio album by American country music singer Ray Scott. It was released in 2005 via Warner Bros. Records. The album includes the singles "My Kind of Music", "Gone Either Way" and "I Didn't Come Here to Talk".

Critical reception
Stephen Thomas Erlewine of Allmusic gave the album four-and-a-half stars, praising Scott's outlaw country influences and the "wry humor". He called the title track "very funny [and] very appealing". Country Standard Time reviewer Michael Sudhalter made a similar comparison to outlaw country. Giving it a "B", Chris Willman of Entertainment Weekly said that Scott "has an old-school baritone and classic country cockiness". Ray Waddell of Billboard gave a mixed review. He wrote that Scott "offers some much-needed Music Row testosterone on ballads like 'I Didn't Come Here to Talk'" and said that Scott sings "more than capably", but thought that Scott was trying to establish credibility by name-dropping on the title track.

Track listing

Personnel
Eddie Bayers- drums, percussion
Barry Beckett- Hammond organ, Wurlitzer
John Boblinger- acoustic guitar
Mike Brignardello- bass guitar
Pat Buchanan- electric guitar, harmonica
Buddy Cannon- baritone guitar, background vocals
Jack Clement- acoustic guitar
Dan Dugmore- acoustic guitar, electric guitar, steel guitar, slide guitar
Kevin "Swine" Grantt- bass guitar
Rob Hajacos- fiddle
John Hobbs- keyboards, Hammond organ, piano
Angela Hurt- background vocals
Doug Kahan- bass guitar
Troy Lancaster- electric guitar
A.J. Masters- bass guitar, acoustic guitar
Randy McCormick- Hammond organ, piano
Phillip Moore- acoustic guitar, electric guitar
Greg Morrow- drums, percussion
Larry Paxton- bass guitar
Mickey Raphael- harmonica
Michael Rhodes- bass guitar
Paul Scholten- drums, percussion
Ray Scott- lead vocals, background vocals
Robby Turner- steel guitar
Steve Wariner- electric guitar
Jonathan Yudkin- fiddle

Chart performance

Album

Singles

References

2005 debut albums
Ray Scott (singer) albums
Albums produced by Buddy Cannon
Warner Records albums